"The Alphabeat" is an instrumental song performed by French DJ David Guetta from his fifth studio album, Nothing but the Beat (2011). The song was written by Guetta and Giorgio Tuinfort, whilst production of the song was helmed by Guetta, Tuinfort and Black Raw. "The Alphabeat" was released digitally on 26 Mar 2012, as the fourth promotional single from the album, following "Titanium", "Lunar" and "Night of Your Life", which were released as part of iTunes' countdown to the release of the album. The Alphabeat was released as a post album promotional single, aimed on promoting the release of the Electronic Album in the United States.

Music video 
The music video for "The Alphabeat" was directed by So Me. The video was uploaded to Guetta's official YouTube account on April 2, 2012. It features many shots of the Renault Twizy, with the music video serving as a commercial for the car itself. The video features a cameo appearance by Guetta's former wife, Cathy Guetta.

Track listing

Credits and personnel 
Credits adapted from the liner notes for Nothing but the Beat.

David Guetta – songwriting, production
Giorgio Tuinfort – songwriting,  production
Black Raw – production

Charts

References

2012 songs
David Guetta songs
Songs written by David Guetta
Songs written by Giorgio Tuinfort
Song recordings produced by David Guetta